Pyrgocythara juliocesari is a species of sea snail, a marine gastropod mollusk in the family Mangeliidae.

Description
The length of the shell attains 2.5mm.

Distribution
This marine species occurs off Cuba at depths between 30 m and 54 m.

References

 Fernández-Garcés R. & Rolán E. (2010) Two new species of the genus Pyrgocythara (Gastropoda, Conidae) from Cuba. Gloria Maris 49(3-4): 67–76.

External links
 

juliocesari
Gastropods described in 2010